Solihull railway station serves the town of Solihull in the West Midlands of England.  The station is served by West Midlands Trains and Chiltern Railways. CrossCountry serve the station occasionally to replace stops at Coventry and Birmingham International during engineering work. Solihull used to have a regular Virgin CrossCountry service to Manchester Piccadilly, Blackpool North and Portsmouth Harbour until 2004, when all services through the station were made to run non-stop between Birmingham and Leamington Spa.

The station booking office is located in a ground level building at the front of the station, from here there is a subway where footsteps and a lift lead up to the island platform. Services are operated by Chiltern Railways to London Marylebone via High Wycombe, West Midlands Trains to Dorridge, extending to Leamington Spa at peak times. The vast majority of Chiltern Railways services terminate at Birmingham Snow Hill, with extensions to Kidderminster at peak times. West Midlands Trains  operate services to Stourbridge Junction on a 20-minute frequency.

History
The original Solihull station was opened in 1852, by the Great Western Railway on their London Paddington to Birmingham and Birkenhead main line. The rebuilt station had two island platforms.

The line and station underwent significant rationalisation in the 1960s and 70s. One island platform was taken out of use when the line was reduced back to double track, the overgrown remains of the disused platform can still be seen. The station also lost its original canopies, and platform buildings, being reduced to a single platform building. Platform canopies were constructed once again in 2007-08, but not to the former GWR scale.

Until 1967 the former GWR London Paddington - Birkenhead Woodside train services passed through the station but few stopped there; these services ceased with the electrification of the former LMS line from London Euston to Birmingham New Street.

Some recent renovations under the auspices of Chiltern Railways has seen the replacement of the station signage with gilt signage inspired by that used by the Great Western Railway.

Facilities
The ticket office is staffed throughout the day, seven days per week whilst a self-service ticket machine is also provided on the concourse (this can be used to collect pre-paid tickets).  A coffee shop, waiting room and toilets are located at platform level, with the platform and subway connected by stairs and lift (the station is therefore fully accessible for disabled passengers).  Train running information is offered via a help point, CIS screens, automated announcements and timetable posters.

Most bus services to Solihull town centre terminate or call at stops outside the station building.

Services
West Midlands Trains run local services as part of the Snow Hill Lines: 

On Sundays, there is an hourly service between Dorridge & Stourbridge Junction.

Chiltern Railways (including Sundays): 
2 trains per hour to either  or Birmingham Snow Hill. On weekday peak hours some services continue to Kidderminster.
2 trains per hour to London Marylebone.
A two-hourly local service between Birmingham Moor Street and Leamington Spa.

References

External links

Rail Around Birmingham and the West Midlands: Solihull station
Warwickshire Railways: Solihull station - Old photographs.

Railway stations in Solihull
DfT Category D stations
Former Great Western Railway stations
Railway stations in Great Britain opened in 1852
Railway stations served by Chiltern Railways
Railway stations served by West Midlands Trains
1852 establishments in England